Kristina Yordanova Grozeva (born January 26, 1976) is a Bulgarian filmmaker. She is best known for her cinematography on feature films such as The Lesson (2014), Glory (2016) and The Father (2019).

Life and career
Grozeva was born on January 26, 1976, in Sofia. She has master's degrees in journalism and film and television directing from Sofia University and the National Academy for Theatre and Film Arts, respectively. Since completing her degree in directing in the class of Georgi Djulgerov, she has been working with her husband, fellow Bulgarian director Petar Valchanov. In 2013, their short film Jump was nominated for Best Short Film at the European Film Awards. In 2014, they released their first feature film The Lesson, which won awards at the film festivals in San Sebastián, Tokyo, Warsaw, Gothenburg, Thessaloniki, Sofia.

The pair next directed the 2016 drama film Glory, which premiered at the Locarno Film Festival and was positively received by critics, as well as 2019's The Father, which features a brief appearance by their then-student Maria Bakalova and won the Crystal Globe Award at the Karlovy Vary International Film Festival. Both Glory and The Father were selected as the Bulgarian entries for the Best International Feature Film at the 90th and 93rd Academy Awards, respectively.

Grozeva is a member of the European Film Academy.

Selected filmography

References

External links 
 
 

1976 births
Living people
People from Sofia
Film people from Sofia
Bulgarian filmmakers
Bulgarian film directors
National Academy for Theatre and Film Arts alumni
Academic staff of the National Academy for Theatre and Film Arts
Sofia University alumni